This is a list of recipients of the Darling Foundation Prize awarded by League of Nations until 1948 and after by World Health Organization (WHO).

The Darling Foundation was established in 1929 in honour of eminent malaria expert Dr. Samuel Taylor Darling, who died tragically while participating in a study expedition for the League of Nations' Malaria Commission. In 1948, WHO acquired control of the Foundation. A bronze medal and a fixed amount of 2500 CHF make up the Darling Foundation Prize, which is given for exceptional work in the pathology, aetiology, epidemiology, treatment, prevention, or control of malaria. It was discontinued in 2000.

List of recipients

See also 

 List of Ihsan Doğramacı Family Health Foundation Prize laureates
 List of Léon Bernard Foundation Prize laureates
 List of Sasakawa Health Prize laureates
 List of Sheikh Sabah Al-Ahmad Al-Jaber Al-Sabah Prize laureates
 List of Dr LEE Jong-wook Memorial Prize for Public Health laureates
 List of Dr A.T. Shousha Foundation Prize and Fellowship laureates
 List of The State of Kuwait Prize for the Control of Cancer, Cardiovascular Diseases and Diabetes in the Eastern Mediterranean Region laureates
 List of Jacques Parisot Foundation Fellowship laureates
 List of United Arab Emirates Health Foundation Prize laureates

References 

World Health Organization
Public health
The Darling Foundation Prize laureates